Kenn Troum (born May 3, 1967), also known as Kenn Scott, is an American actor, puppeteer, filmmaker, former stuntman and martial artist.

Early life and career 
Troum was born May 3, 1967, in New York City and presently lives in Fort Worth, Texas. A martial artist and former stuntman, he is most well known as an actor. His most noteworthy credit is his portrayal of Raphael in the hit films Teenage Mutant Ninja Turtles (as a stunt performer) and Teenage Mutant Ninja Turtles II: The Secret of the Ooze (as the suit performer), under his real name Kenn Troum.

He subsequently changed his stage name to Kenn Scott, and broadened his experience to working in action cinema both in front of and behind the camera.  As "Kenn Scott", he had starring roles in the direct-to-video action-adventure films Showdown, Star Hunter, and Sworn To Justice, and received national press attention for his directorial debut, the short, martial-arts comedy Better Never Than Late as well as the action film, Adventures of Johnny Tao: Rock Around the Dragon.

References

External links 

1967 births
American male film actors
Living people